Max Healthcare Institute Limited is an Indian hospital chain based in New Delhi. Max Healthcare owns and operates healthcare facilities across Delhi National Capital Region, as well as one hospital each in Mohali, Bathinda, Dehradun, and Mumbai.

History
Max Healthcare opened its first medical center in South Delhi's Panchsheel Park in 2000. The company opened two other secondary care centers in Pitampura in North West Delhi and the eastern Delhi suburb of Noida in 2002.

In 2004, the company commissioned the East Block of its flagship tertiary care Hospitals called Max Hospital, Saket in South Delhi.

Max Healthcare ventured into Gurgaon, the South Western suburb of Delhi with a secondary care hospital in 2007.

In 2011, Max Healthcare entered into a public–private partnership (PPP) agreement with the government of Punjab, India and set up two hospitals in Mohali near Chandigarh and in Bathinda. In the same year, Max Healthcare commissioned its tertiary care hospital in Shalimar Bagh, North West Delhi.

In 2012, Life Healthcare Group acquired a 26% stake in Max Healthcare for 516 crore. In 2014, Life Healthcare Group invested another 766 crore in the company to increase its stake to 46.41% and to become an equal joint venture partner with Max India.

In 2015, Max Healthcare acquired Pushpanjali Crosslay Hospital in Vaishali, Ghaziabad, and the Saket City Hospital in Saket. These hospitals were subsequently rechristened as Max Hospital, Vaishali, and Max Smart Hospital, Saket.

A standalone oncology center called Max Cancer Centre was commissioned in Lajpat Nagar, South Delhi in 2016.

In 2018, Life Healthcare Group announced that it would sell its entire 49.7% stake in Max Healthcare and exit the joint venture with Max India. In 2019, Radiant Lifecare acquired 49.7% stake in Max Health Institute Limited for 2136 crore and Abhay Soi was made chairman. In 2020, Max Healthcare merged with Radiant Lifecare, which operated BLK Hospital in Central Delhi and the Nanavati Hospital in Mumbai, to emerge as the second-largest healthcare company by revenue.

The company listed on the stock exchanges in August 2020. Between 2021 and 2022, co-promoter KKR & Co. Inc. sold its entire stake in Max Healthcare. As a result, Abhay Soi became the sole promoter of the company with over 23% stake.

Subsidiaries
Max Lab provides diagnostics and pathology services through its own labs and partner entities. It is the third-largest diagnostics chain in north India.
Max@Home provides home care, home health nursing, house call and medicine delivery services among others.

Controversy 
During the outbreak of COVID 19, a controversy stirred about the charges exercised by the hospital for those who were positive. The hospital later clarified that those charges were inclusive of other charges.

References

External links

Health care companies established in 2000
Companies based in Delhi
Hospitals in Delhi
Hospitals established in 2000
Indian companies established in 2000
Health care companies of India
Hospital networks in India
2000 establishments in Delhi
Companies listed on the National Stock Exchange of India
Companies listed on the Bombay Stock Exchange